Buzău is a town, in the east of Romania.

Buzău may also refer to:

 Buzău County, a county in the east of Romania
 Buzău River, a river in the east of Romania, flowing through Buzău County
 Buzău Pass, a pass in the Eastern Carpathians mountain range, along the Buzău River, linking Transylvania with Moldavia
 Buzău Mountains, Romania
 Urmuz (1883–1923), pseudonymous Romanian writer, known in real life as Ionescu-Buzeu or Demetrescu-Buzău